Pavlovce nad Uhom (Romani: Pavlovcis) is a village and municipality in the Slovak district of Michalovce, which lies in the Eastern Slovak Kosice Region.

The population of the village is around 4,500 inhabitants. Apart from the village itself, which predates medieval times, the municipality Pavlovce nad Uhom was established in 1960 through the merger of two separate municipalities – Pavlovce nad Uhom and Ťahyňa.

History
After the decay of the Great Moravian Empire, Slovak territory including the East Slovak Lowland became part of the Kingdom of Hungary for nearly a thousand years. Its territory was colonized by Hungarians, in three phases, who have sequentially mixed with the native Slavic and Slovak population. New guard posts and settlements of strategical importance started to appear along the borders of the young Kingdom of Hungary.

According to professor Ferdinant Uličný, Pavlovce nad Uhom was established by Cuman watch-keeping units (in Russian:  – , ;). Captured Cumans were forced to participate in military service as sentinels. The name Pavlovce or Plavce was not given to the early settlement by the Cumans themselves but by Slovak inhabitants and Hungarian nobles during the following decades. Others, however, support a different explanation: that the name was derived from the popular Slavic name Pavol.

The first written record of the municipality dates to 1327 when Charles I of Hungary in his donation agreement confirmed ownership of Pavlovce in favor of Peter called Túz.

In 1417, for the merits of Matthew II of Pavlovce (died 1437) and George of Pavlovce (died 10 April 1439, Esztergom), members of the noble family from Pavlovce (de Palócz), Emperor Sigismund of Luxembourg rewarded the two brothers with confirmation of their ownership. In the 15th and 16th centuries, Pavlovce became the center of the manor consisting of the surrounding municipalities such as Bežovce, Blatná Polianka, Čabraď (pri Bežovciach), Chyzzer (pri Bajanoch), Kapušianske Kľačany, Iňačovce, Rebrín, Senné, Tašuľa a Záhor. Later, in 1670, the manor of Blatný potok (Sárospatak) was attacked. The noble family of Pavlovce vanished in mail tail by the death of Anton of Pavlovce (died 29 August 1526) in the Battle of Mohács in 1526. The Dobó de Ruzska noble family became the new legitimate owners of Pavlovce manor.

In the 17th century, the Reformation movement was spreading through the Kingdom of Hungary; anti-Turkish and anti-Habsburg wars took place, negatively affecting the local population with camping armies and heavy taxes. In 1670, the municipality lost its owner Mikuláš Forgáč and was consequently divided among several nobles such as George and Imrich Horváth of Pavlovce.

In 1711, after the Treaty of Szatmár, the followers of Francis II Rákóczi (1676–1735) were forced, under threat of losing wealth or exile, to swear allegiance to the king. This was the case of two nobles to whom Pavlovce belonged, Francis Barkóci and George Horváth.

Geography
It has a population of 4,439 people.

The list of neighboring villages includes: North – Senné and Bežovce, South – Veškovce, Čierne pole and Krišovská Liesková, East – Vysoká nad Uhom and Bajany, West – Stretavka and Stretava. The municipality used to be part of Ung County during the era of the Kingdom of Hungary. Pavlovce nad Uhom as it is known today was created in 1960 through the merger of Pavlovce nad Uhom and Ťahyňa.

Demographics
According to 2008 data, the majority of the population of the city (about 57.7%) are ethnically Roma.

Geology and geomorphology
Geomorphologically, Pavlovce nad Uhom belongs to the East Slovak Plain and its subgroups of Kapušany Flatlands and Senné Wet Ground. The countryside of plains and flood plains consists of Holocene clay and loamy sand sediments, and the remains of old river arms.

Its geological structure consists of flood plain sediments, Pleistocene aeolian sands and sand dunes.

Climate
The area of Pavlovce nad Uhom is drained by the river Uzh which originates in the Ukrainian Uzh Pass and leads to the river Laborec near a municipality named Stretavka.

There is a lake near Pavlovce nad Uhom, called Ortov, connected to the river Uzh via an underground water system whose water level increases and decreases depending on the river flow. According to a map from 1863, several meres, called lakes by the locals, existed in the municipality's territory. The area is known to have quality ground waters.

Defunct architectural and historical monuments
Several buildings associated with the lives of local nobility do not exist anymore.

Medieval church
The medieval church, known to exist in the 13th century, was consecrated on an unknown date. It is known from letters from George and Matthew of Pavlovce that the church contained the family tomb. The exact location of the church is unconfirmed.

Medieval mansion
Its remains are likely located in the western part of the local park.

Baroque-classicist manor house

It had a  rectangular plan with towers in the corners with rhomboid-shaped plan. Locals say that the manor house's four wings and four towers symbolized the four seasons, twelve chimneys the twelve months, fifty-three rooms fifty-three weeks, and 365 doors and windows 365 days in a year.

The manor house was severely damaged after WWII and thus, in the 1950s, was torn down by the locals. Many photographs of the manor house still exist in private or state-owned archives.

Garden pavilion

The pavilion was located in the northern part of the park separating the park from a garden. The building was built in Empire style with a  rectangular plan.

Farmstead in Ortov
This agricultural building, built in Classicist style, was situated south of the floodplain forest near the river arm Ortov. The central part of the building served as a granary, the side wings as a sty and the rest for various agricultural purposes.

Preserved architectural and historical monuments
The following monuments can be seen in the municipality.

Roman Catholic Church of St. John the Baptist
The church was completed in the 1790s. Wall paintings, including pictures of the church itself and Esztergom Basilica on each side of the triumphal arch, come from 1843. The single-aisle body of the church is vaulted with two fields of Prussian vaults. Rotating stairs in southern part of the church lead to the three-axis matroneum above, containing an organ. The communion table, sanctuary and seats for celebrants are located in the northern part of the church. The room above sacristy holds seats, reserved in the past for patrons and nobles. There is a wooden Classicist altar from 1800 with a modern statue of the Sacred Heart located in the right part of the triumphal arch and a preserved original Classicist pulpit with conic tribune and canopy on the left. The statue of the Immaculate Heart of Mary on the left and statue of the Sacred Heart on the right decorate the façade of the yellow-white building. The church tower holds a belfry and the mechanism for the functional tower clock.

Riding hall
The Neoclassical building, known as  among the locals, was probably built at the end of the 19th century.

The Holy Shrine of John of Nepomuk
The Holy Shrine of John of Nepomuk, built in 1899 in Neoclassical style, covers a late Baroque statue of the saint from the second half of the 18th century originally located south of the park (according to a historical map from 1863). The sandstone statue models a statue made by John Brokoff displayed on Charles Bridge. The depicted clothing consists of surplice and biretta, pointing to John of Nepomuk's occupation as vicar and priest as well. The polychrome statue of the saint features him standing on a pedestal holding a crucifix with corpus in his right hand, resting on his chest. The left hand, left alongside the body, carries a palm twig.

Defunct manor house park
The park's entrance is located at the center of the village. The park features two playgrounds, an amphitheater (which serves as a pub) with a stage and projecting masonry cab, a special elementary school yard and dilapidated pub known as Letná. A mound, among locals called , is located in the western part.

The park is mostly flat except for the amphitheater's slope, the mound  and excavation with adjacent embankment called .

The following plant species can be found in the park: oak, linden, maple, hornbeam, ash, sycamore, horse chestnut, hawthorn, hazel, privet, mulberry, elderberry, elm, willow and ivy.

Greek Catholic Church of the Holy Trinity of Ease
The sacred building dated to the early 1890s, situated in Ťahyňa, is registered by the Monuments Board of the Slovak Republic as a National Cultural Monument.

Jewish cemetery
Most of the tombstones are made of sandstone. The cemetery is not maintained, is overgrown with trees and is not registered as a National Cultural Monument. In the past, Jewish Salem and Mikvah existed in the municipality, as well.

Notable personalities
Paul (Pavol) Balla (born 17 April 1930, Pavlovce nad Uhom), Ukrainian visual artist
Francis (František) Barkóci (Barkóczy) (birth unknown – died 1709, Pavlovce nad Uhom), Zemplén County head, Kuruc general, later promoted to the status of count.
John (Ján) Bubán (19 January 1914, Pavlovce nad Uhom – 24 November 1989, Pezinok), professor of theology, philosopher, persecuted by the Communist regime in the 1950s.
Stephen (Štefan) Bubán (29 July 1932, Pavlovce nad Uhom), graphic artist devoted to drawings, paintings and monumental works.
Andrei (Andrej) Budiš (Bugyis, Bugyiš) (6 December 1824, Pavlovce nad Uhom – 26 December 1890, Uzhgorod), Satu Mare diocese priest, known for his social activities.
Andrei (Andrej) Budiš (Bugyis, Bugyiš) (5 December 1837, Pavlovce nad Uhom – 23 April 1864, Satu Mare), writer, priest and journalist.
George (Juraj) Čalfa (Csalfa) (1 April 1905, Ťahyňa – 23 July 1962, Čeľovce), Roman Catholic priest persecuted by the Communist regime in the 1950s.
John (Ján) Hadik (23 November 1863, Pavlovce nad Uhom – 10 December 1933, Budapest), member of the Diet of Hungary, Secretary of Ministry of Interior, count, officer.
Adam Horvát (Horváth) (30 April 1691, Pavlovce nad Uhom – 22 October 1746), noble, author of descriptive work on Ung County titled .
John (Ján) Horvát (Horváth) (17th century), noble, George Rákóczi's secretary, author of historical study.
Joseph (Jozef) Jóna (7 November 1863, Irša – death unknown), Roman Catholic priest active in Pavlovce, the papal chamberlain (Mukachevo).
Adalbert Kazinci (Kazinczy) (1871, Pavlovce nad Uhom – 3 November 1947, USA), priest and journalist active in the U.S.
John (Ján) Kondor (born 5 June 1953, Pavlovce nad Uhom), poet, journalist, editor for Radio Studio of Slovak Radio in Košice.
Valentine (Valentín) Novajovský, teacher, platoon commander of participants in the Slovak National Uprising.
Anton Palóci (Palóczy) (died 29 August 1526, near Mohács), noble, county head of Zemplén County.
Dominic (Dominik) Palóci (Palóczy) (died 1403), abbot of Lelesz Abbey.
George (Juraj) Palóci (Palóczy) (died 10 May 1439, Esztergom) Transylvanian bishop, archbishop of Esztergom, Hungarian chancellor and anti-Hussite movement organizer.
Ladislav Palóci (Palóczy) (died 1470), noble, county head of Zemplén County, Sigismund's of Luxembourg knight.
Matthew (Matúš) Palóci (Palóczy) (died 1437) county head of various counties, Sigismund's of Luxembourg palatine.

Government
Pavlovce has its own birth register office and police force but relies on the district and tax offices at Michalovce.

Culture
The village has a small public library, a football pitch, and a gymnasium.

Economy
The village has a number of food stores, a Slovak bank and an insurance branch.

Transport

References

External links

 Pavloce na Uhom official website

Villages and municipalities in Michalovce District